The 2018 Purdue Boilermakers baseball team was a baseball team that represented Purdue University in the 2018 NCAA Division I baseball season. The Boilermakers were members of the Big Ten Conference and played their home games at Alexander Field in West Lafayette, Indiana. They were led by second-year head coach Mark Wasikowski.

Preseason

Previous season
In 2017, Purdue compiled a 29–27 record (12–12 in conference play) during the regular season, qualifying for a postseason for the first season since 2012. Purdue's 19 win improvement in 2017 from 2016 was the largest improvement in NCAA Division I baseball during the 2017 season.

Coaching staff changes
On July 20, 2017, Purdue hired Greg Goff to join the baseball team as a volunteer assistant, replacing Jack Marder who left for the same position with Stanford.

MLB Draft
No Boilermakers on the 2017 roster were selected in the 2017 Major League Baseball draft.

Departed Players
The following Boilermakers on the 2017 roster departed the program prior to the 2018 season:

Recruiting Class
The Boilermakers added the following players to the roster as part of their 2017 recruiting class:

Roster

Schedule

! style="" | Regular Season
|- valign="top" 

|- bgcolor="#bbbbbb"
| 1 || February 16 || at  || Baylor Ballpark • Waco, Texas || Cancelled || – || – || – || – || 0–0 || –
|- bgcolor="#ccffcc"
| 2 || February 17 || vs  || Perfect Game Park • Emerson, Georgia || 5–1 || Andrews (1–0) || Szott (0–1) || Learnard (1) || - || 1–0 || –
|- bgcolor="#ccffcc"
| 3 || February 17 || vs Western Michigan || Perfect Game Park • Emerson, Georgia || 5–1 || Wojtysiak (1–0) || Laio (0–1) || None || 210 || 2–0 || –
|- bgcolor="#bbbbbb"
| 4 || February 17 || at Baylor || Baylor Ballpark • Waco, Texas || Cancelled || – || – || – || – || 2–0 || –
|- bgcolor="#ccffcc"
| 5 || February 18 || vs Western Michigan || Perfect Game Park • Emerson, Georgia || 10–4 || Hofstra (1–0) || Townsend-Chase (0–1) || None || 221 || 3–0 || –
|- bgcolor="#bbbbbb"
| 6 || February 18 || at Baylor || Baylor Ballpark • Waco, Texas || Cancelled || – || – || – || – || 3–0 || –
|- bgcolor="#ccffcc"
| 7 || February 23 || vs  || Nelson W. Wolff Municipal Stadium • San Antonio, Texas || 5–2 || Stroh (1–0) || Wark (1–1) || Hofstra (1) || 198 || 4–0 || –
|- bgcolor="#ccffcc"
| 8 || February 23 || vs  || Nelson W. Wolff Municipal Stadium • San Antonio, Texas || 5–4 || Cheaney (1–0) || Schull (1–1) || None || 456 || 5–0 || –
|- bgcolor="#ffcccc"
| 9 || February 24 || vs #30  || Nelson W. Wolff Municipal Stadium • San Antonio, Texas || 2–4 || Vail (1–0) || Learnard (0–1) || None || 222 || 5–1 || –
|- bgcolor="#ccffcc"
| 10 || February 25 || vs #30 Notre Dame || Nelson W. Wolff Municipal Stadium • San Antonio, Texas || 8–7 || Williams (1–0) || Combs (0–1) || None || 443 || 6–1 || –
|-

|- bgcolor="#ccffcc"
| 11 || March 2 || vs  || Melching Field at Conrad Park • DeLand, Florida || 11–1 || Stroh (2–0) || Brettell (1–2) || None || - || 7–1 || –
|- bgcolor="#ccffcc"
| 12 || March 3 || vs  || Melching Field at Conrad Park • DeLand, Florida || 12–5 || Andrews (2–0) || Seymour (1–1) || None || 386 || 8–1 || –
|- bgcolor="#ffcccc"
| 13 || March 4 || at  || Melching Field at Conrad Park • DeLand, Florida || 6–11 || Onyshko (2–0) || Kornacker (0–1) || Wilson (5) || 902 || 8–2 || –
|- bgcolor="#ffcccc"
| 14 || March 9 || at  || Greer Field at Turchin Stadium • New Orleans, Louisiana || 0–1 || Roper (1–2) || Andrews (2–1) || Bjorngjeld (1) || 1,648 || 8–3 || –
|- bgcolor="#ccffcc"
| 15 || March 10 || at Tulane || Greer Field at Turchin Stadium • New Orleans, Louisiana || 12–8 || Williams (2–0) || Massey (1–2) || None || 1,654 || 9–3 || –
|- bgcolor="#ffcccc"
| 16 || March 11 || at Tulane || Greer Field at Turchin Stadium • New Orleans, Louisiana || 2–6 || Gillies (2–1) || Hofstra (1–1) || None || 1,582 || 9–4 || –
|- bgcolor="#ffcccc"
| 17 || March 13 || at  || Pat Kenelly Diamond at Alumni Field • Hammond, Louisiana || 0–4 || Knopp (1–1) || Johnson (0–1) || None || 1,422 || 9–5 || –
|- bgcolor="#ffcccc"
| 18 || March 14 || at  || Ben Meyer Diamond at Ray E. Didier Field • Thibodaux, Louisiana || 2–4 || Taylor (1–1) || Beard (0–1) || Hatcher (1) || 312 || 9–6 || –
|- bgcolor="#ffcccc"
| 19 || March 17 || at Saint Louis || Billiken Sports Center • Saint Louis, Missouri || 1–15 || Hogan (3–1) || Andrews (2–2) || None || - || 9–7 || –
|- bgcolor="#ffcccc"
| 20 || March 17 || at Saint Louis || Billiken Sports Center • Saint Louis, Missouri || 9–11 || Sommerfeld (1–0) || Williams (2–1) || None || 173 || 9–8 || –
|- bgcolor="#ffcccc"
| 21 || March 18 || at Saint Louis || Billiken Sports Center • Saint Louis, Missouri || 3–7 || Reveno (3–1) || Hofstra (1–2) || None || 117 || 9–9 || –
|- bgcolor="#ffcccc"
| 22 || March 23 ||  || Alexander Field • West Lafayette, Indiana || 1–3 || Dorso (1–1) || Andrews (2–3) || Knox (3) || – || 9–10 || –
|- bgcolor="#ccffcc"
| 23 || March 23 || Lipscomb || Alexander Field • West Lafayette, Indiana || 6–2 || Stroh (3–0) || Kachmar (1–1) || None || 843 || 10–10 || –
|- bgcolor="#bbbbbb"
| 24 || March 25 || Lipscomb || Alexander Field • West Lafayette, Indiana || Cancelled || – || – || – || – || 10–10 || –
|- bgcolor="#ccffcc"
| 25 || March 28 ||  || Alexander Field • West Lafayette, Indiana || 4–1 || Beard (1–1) || Hammel (1–1) || Learnard (2) || 912 || 11–10 || –
|- bgcolor="#ccffcc"
| 26 || March 30 || at  || Medlar Field • University Park, Pennsylvania || 3–2 || Andrews (3–3) || Hagenman (2–3) || Learnard (3) || 638 || 12–10 || 1–0
|- bgcolor="#ccffcc"
| 27 || March 31 || at Penn State || Medlar Field • University Park, Pennsylvania || 6–3 || Stroh (4–0) || Lehman (2–3) || Cheaney (1) || – || 13–10 || 2–0
|- bgcolor="#ccffcc"
| 28 || March 31 || at Penn State || Medlar Field • University Park, Pennsylvania || 9–0 || Johnson (1–1) || Biasi (1–3) || None || 1,002 || 14–10 || 3–0
|-

|- bgcolor="#bbbbbb"
| 29 || April 3 ||  || Alexander Field • West Lafayette, Indiana || Cancelled || – || – || – || – || 14–10 || 3–0
|- bgcolor="#bbbbbb"
| 30 || April 4 || Oakland || Alexander Field • West Lafayette, Indiana || Cancelled || – || – || – || – || 14–10 || 3–0
|- bgcolor="#ccffcc"
| 31 || April 6 || at #10 Indiana || Bart Kaufman Field • Bloomington, Indiana || 4–2 || Learnard (1–1) || Krueger (1–3) || None || 1,714 || 15–10 || 4–0
|- bgcolor="#ffcccc"
| 32 || April 7 || at #10 Indiana || Bart Kaufman Field • Bloomington, Indiana || 1–14 || Milto (5–2) || Stroh (4–1) || None || 2,190 || 15–11 || 4–1
|- bgcolor="#ffcccc"
| 33 || April 8 || at #10 Indiana || Bart Kaufman Field • Bloomington, Indiana || 5–7 || Lloyd (2–0) || Williams (2–2) || None || 2,265 || 15–12 || 4–2
|- bgcolor="#ffcccc"
| 34 || April 10 ||  || Alexander Field • West Lafayette, Indiana || 0–2 || Floyd (4–0) || Beard (1–2) || Freed (2) || 735 || 15–13 || 4–2
|- bgcolor="#ffcccc"
| 35 || April 13 ||  || Alexander Field • West Lafayette, Indiana || 7–22 || Schulze (7–0) || Hofstra (1–3) || None || 1,280 || 15–14 || 4–3
|- bgcolor="#ffcccc"
| 36 || April 14 || Minnesota || Alexander Field • West Lafayette, Indiana || 8–18 || Lackney (2–2) || Stroh (4–2) || None || 1,378 || 15–15 || 4–4
|- bgcolor="#bbbbbb"
| 37 || April 15 || Minnesota || Alexander Field • West Lafayette, Indiana || Cancelled || – || – || – || – || 15–15 || 4–4
|- bgcolor="#ccffcc"
| 38 || April 17 ||  || Bob Warn Field at Sycamore Stadium • Terre Haute, Indiana || 3–1 || Learnard (2–1) || Larrison (1–3) || None || 436 || 16–15 || 4–4
|- bgcolor="#ffcccc"
| 39 || April 18 || at Indiana State || Alexander Field • West Lafayette, Indiana || 1–2 || Rivers (1–0) || Beard (1–3) || Grauer (2) || 824 || 16–16 || 4–4
|- bgcolor="#ccffcc"
| 40 || April 20 || at  || Shipley Field • College Park, Maryland || 7–1 || Andrews (4–3) || DiLuia (1–3) || Learnard (4) || 926 || 17–16 || 5–4
|- bgcolor="#ccffcc"
| 41 || April 21 || at Maryland || Shipley Field • College Park, Maryland || 4–3 || Parker (1–0) || Biondic (2–1) || Learnard (5) || 846 || 18–16 || 6–4
|- bgcolor="#ccffcc"
| 42 || April 22 || at Maryland || Shipley Field • College Park, Maryland || 8–6 || Hofstra (2–3) || Burleson (0–1) || Learnard (6) || 992 || 19–16 || 7–4
|- bgcolor="#ccffcc"
| 43 || April 24 ||  || Alexander Field • West Lafayette, Indiana || 8–1 || Bohm (1–0) || Kaplan (0–2) || None || 652 || 20–16 || 7–4
|- bgcolor="#ccffcc"
| 44 || April 25 || #15 Indiana || Alexander Field • West Lafayette, Indiana || 5–3 || Beard (2–3) || Manous (1–1) || Learnard (7) || 2,369 || 21–16 || 7–4
|- bgcolor="#ccffcc"
| 45 || April 27 ||  || Alexander Field • West Lafayette, Indiana || 4–0 || Andrews (5–3) || O'Reilly (5–2) || None || 1,194 || 22–16 || 8–4
|- bgcolor="#ccffcc"
| 46 || April 28 || Rutgers || Alexander Field • West Lafayette, Indiana || 9–4 || Stroh (5–2) || Rutkowski (4–4) || None || 1,242 || 23–16 || 9–4
|- bgcolor="#ccffcc"
| 47 || April 29 || Rutgers || Alexander Field • West Lafayette, Indiana || 1–0 || Johnson (2–1) || Blum (0–3) || Learnard (8) || 1,012 || 24–16 || 10–4
|-

|- bgcolor="#ccffcc"
| 48 || May 4 ||  || Alexander Field • West Lafayette, Indiana || 8–7 || Hofstra (3–3) || Fordon (1–6) || Learnard (9) || 1,324 || 25–16 || 11–4
|- bgcolor="#ccffcc"
| 49 || May 5 || Northwestern || Alexander Field • West Lafayette, Indiana || 9–5 || Parker (2–0) || Christie (2–5) || Learnard (10) || 1,121 || 26–16 || 12–4
|- bgcolor="#ccffcc"
| 50 || May 6 || Northwestern || Alexander Field • West Lafayette, Indiana || 9–2 || Beard (3–3) || Bader (1–3) || None || 1,272 || 27–16 || 13–4
|- bgcolor="#ccffcc"
| 51 || May 8 ||  || Alexander Field • West Lafayette, Indiana || 27–3 || Bohm (2–0) || Odzark (1–6) || Kornacker (1) || 1,230 || 28–16 || 13–4
|- bgcolor="#ccffcc"
| 52 || May 9 || at Ball State || Ball Diamond • Muncie, Indiana || 10–8 || Beard (4–3) || Floyd (5–1) || Learnard (11) || 307 || 29–16 || 13–4
|- bgcolor="#ffcccc"
| 53 || May 11 || at  || Bill Davis Stadium • Columbus, Ohio || 2–4 || Curlis (7–3) || Andrews (5–4) || Kinker (12) || 1,895 || 29–17 || 13–5
|- bgcolor="#ccffcc"
| 54 || May 12 || at Ohio State || Bill Davis Stadium • Columbus, Ohio || 8–2 || Parker (3–0) || Feltner (4–4) || Moore (1) || 1,305 || 30–17 || 14–5
|- bgcolor="#ffcccc"
| 55 || May 13 || at Ohio State || Bill Davis Stadium • Columbus, Ohio || 6–16 || Woodby (4–0) || Cheaney (1–1) || Kinker (13) || 1,058 || 30–18 || 14–6
|- bgcolor="#ccffcc"
| 56 || May 15 ||  || Alexander Field • West Lafayette, Indiana || 7–6 || Parker (4–0) || Womacks (3–1) || Learnard (12) || 811 || 31–18 || 14–6
|- bgcolor="#ccffcc"
| 57 || May 17 || #17  || Alexander Field • West Lafayette, Indiana || 3–0 || Andrews (6–4) || Henry (7–3) || Learnard (13) || 1,650 || 32–18 || 15–6
|- bgcolor="#ccffcc"
| 58 || May 18 || #17 Michigan || Alexander Field • West Lafayette, Indiana || 6–3 || Hofstra (4–3) || Vancena (3–4) || Learnard (14) || 1,292 || 33–18 || 16–6
|- bgcolor="#ccffcc"
| 59 || May 19 || #17 Michigan || Alexander Field • West Lafayette, Indiana || 2–1 || Beard (5–3) || Kauffmann (6–3) || Learnard (15) || 1,868 || 34–18 || 17–6
|-

|-
! style="" | Postseason
|- valign="top" 

|- bgcolor="#ccffcc"
| 60 || May 23 || vs Ohio State || TD Ameritrade Park Omaha • Omaha, Nebraska || 8–2|| Andrews (7–4) || Curlis (7–4) || None || – || 35–18 || 17–6
|- bgcolor="#ccffcc"
| 61 || May 24 || vs Michigan || TD Ameritrade Park Omaha • Omaha, Nebraska || 5–4 || Parker (5–0) || Tribucher (4–4) || None || – || 36–18 || 17–6
|- bgcolor="#ccffcc"
| 62 || May 26 || vs Illinois || TD Ameritrade Park Omaha • Omaha, Nebraska || 11–5 || Hofstra (5–3) || Schmidt (2–3) || None || – || 37–18 || 17–6
|- bgcolor="#ffcccc"
| 63 || May 27 || vs #15 Minnesota || TD Ameritrade Park Omaha • Omaha, Nebraska || 4–6 || Thoresen (2–2) || Cheaney (1–2) || Meyer (16) || 1,931 || 37–19 || 17–6
|-

|- bgcolor="#ffcccc"
| 64 || June 1 || vs #21  || Boshamer Stadium • Chapel Hill, North Carolina || 1–9 || Fletcher (7–3) || Andrews (7–5) || None || 1,867 || 37–20 || 17–6
|- bgcolor="#ccffcc"
| 65 || June 2 || vs  || Boshamer Stadium • Chapel Hill, North Carolina || 14–4 || Johnson (3–1) || Johnson (7–2) || None || 1,858 || 38–20 || 17–6
|- bgcolor="#ffcccc"
| 66 || June 3 || vs #21 Houston || Boshamer Stadium • Chapel Hill, North Carolina || 4–8 || Puldio (6–2) || Learnard (2–2) || None || 1,753 || 38–21 || 17–6
|-

Rankings

Awards and honors

Weekly awards

Conference awards

National awards

References

Purdue
Purdue Boilermakers baseball seasons
Purdue